Milicia Popular was a Communist newspaper, which served as a mouthpiece for the Loyalist Fifth Regiment, published from July 26, 1936 to January 24, 1937. It was published by Benigno Rodríguez. Notable contributors include Eduardo Ugarte.

References 

Spanish Civil War
Communist newspapers
Communism in Spain